
The Depressariinae – sometimes spelled "Depressiinae" in error – are a subfamily of moths in the superfamily Gelechioidea. Like their relatives therein, their exact relationships are not yet very well resolved. It has been considered part of family Elachistidae sensu lato or included in an expanded Oecophoridae. In modern classifications they are treated as the distinct gelechioid family Depressariidae.

As regards subdivisions, the Amphisbatinae are often held to be as close to the Depressariinae as to be included there, in particular if the latter are raised to full family rank, but also otherwise (as a tribe Amphisbatini in the Depressariinae). If Depressariinae are treated as oecophorid subfamily, it is more common to include the group around Cryptolechia, which is sometimes (especially in older arrangements) separated as tribe Cryptolechiini in subfamily Cryptolechiinae. The lineage of Cacochroa and its closest relatives – typically included in the "Cryptolechiinae" if these are treated as independent oecophorid subfamily – actually seems to be closer to Orophia, and would be part of tribe Orophiini if these are placed in the Oecophorinae. But they have also been included in the present group (as tribe(s) Orophiini and sometimes also Cacochroini), particularly if this is considered a full-fledged family. The same holds true for the Xyloryctidae, a group treated here as family but previously thought to be a subfamily of the Oecophoridae. Finally, the Semioscopis lineage is occasionally separated from the rest of the Depressariinae as tribe Epigraphiini (after its junior synonym Epigraphia). In all such treatments, the core group of Depressariinae becomes a tribe Depressariini.

Distribution and ecology
Some 600 species were placed here as of 1999 (but see the caveats about the group's circumscription above). New taxa of Depressariinae are still being discovered and described on a regular basis. The group is found worldwide except on some oceanic islands and frozen wasteland, but the diversity is highest in temperate regions and the group is presumably Holarctic in origin – possibly Palaearctic, as gelechoid diversity in the Neotropics is poor but e.g. in Australia almost 20 species are found. From Europe alone, more than 160 species and subspecies (mostly of genus Agonopterix) were known in 2009, with over 80 recorded from Central Europe.

The caterpillars usually develop in leaves spun together with silk, as stem borers or as seed or flower feeders of dicotyledons. Recorded Depressariinae host plants are mainly eurosids I (e.g. Betulaceae, Fabaceae, Fagaceae, Rosaceae, Salicaceae, Urticaceae) but also from some other families (e.g. Malvaceae and Rutaceae – eurosids II –, or euasterids II like Apiaceae and Asteraceae).

Genera

Genera of Depressariinae – with some notable species also listed – include:

Tribe Fuchsiini
Fuchsia Spuler, 1910
Tribe Telechrysidini
Telechrysis Toll, 1956
Tribe Depressariini
Agonopterix Hübner, 1825
Apachea Clarke, 1941
Bibarrambla Clarke, 1941
Depressaria
Exaeretia Stainton, 1849
Himmacia Clarke, 1941
Levipalpus Hannemann, 1953
Luquetia Leraut, 1991
Nites Hodges, 1974
Semioscopis Hübner, 1825
Tribe Amphisbatini
Eupragia Walsingham, 1911
Machimia (Amphisbatinae?)
Psilocorsis Clemens, 1860 (Amphisbatinae?)
Unplaced to tribe
Acria Stephens, 1834
Afdera Clarke, 1978
Ancipita Busck, 1914
Athrinacia Walsingham, 1911
Barantola Walker, 1864
Bleptochiton Turner, 1947
Chariphylla Meyrick, 1921
Comotechna Meyrick, 1920
Costoma Busck, 1914
Deloryctis Meyrick, 1934
Doina Clarke, 1978
Doleromima Meyrick, 1902
Doshia Clarke, 1978
Eclecta Meyrick, 1883
Ectaga Walsingham, 1912
Enchocrates Meyrick, 1883
Enteremna Meyrick, 1917
Erithyma Meyrick, 1914
Euprionocera Turner, 1896
Eutorna Meyrick, 1889
Filinota Busck, 1911
Gnathotona Meyrick, 1931
Gonada Busck, 1911
Gymnoceros Turner, 1946
Habrophylax Meyrick, 1931
Haereta Turner, 1947
Hamadera Busck, 1914
Hastamea Busck, 1940
Heterobathra Lower, 1901
Himotica Meyrick, 1912
Hozbeka Özdikmen, 2009 (formerly Talitha Clarke, 1978 (non Faure, 1958: preoccupied))
Idiocrates Meyrick, 1909
Iphimachaera Meyrick, 1931
Lepidozancla Turner, 1916
Loboptila Turner, 1919
Lucyna Clarke, 1978
Maesara Clarke, 1968
Magniophaga Beéche, 2018
Mimozela Meyrick, 1914
Muna Clarke, 1978
Nedenia Clarke, 1978
Nematochares Meyrick, 1931
Notosara Meyrick, 1890
Octasphales Meyrick, 1886
Osmarina Clarke, 1978
Palinorsa Meyrick, 1924
Pedois Lower, 1894
Peritornenta Turner, 1900
Perzelia Clarke, 1978
Philtronoma Meyrick, 1914
Pholcobates Meyrick, 1931
Phytomimia Walsingham, 1912
Pisinidea Butler, 1883
Profilinota Clarke, 1973
Pseudocentris Meyrick, 1921
Psittacastis Meyrick, 1909
Psorosticha Lower, 1901
Ptilobola Meyrick, 1933
Rhindoma Busck, 1914
Scoliographa Meyrick, 1916
Scorpiopsis Turner, 1894
Thalamarchella T. B. Fletcher, 1940 (formerly Thalamarchis Meyrick, 1904 (non Meyrick, 1897: preoccupied))
Thyromorpha Turner, 1917
Tonica Walker, 1864
Trycherodes Meyrick, 1914

Footnotes

References

 See also Gelechioidea Talk page for comparison of some approaches to gelechioid systematics and taxonomy.
  (2008): Australian Faunal Directory – Depressariidae [sic]. Version of 9 October 2008. Retrieved 24 April 2010.
  (2009): Depressariidae [sic]. Version 2.1, 22 December 2009. Retrieved 22 February 2010.
  (1999): The Gelechioidea. In: : Handbuch der Zoologie/Handbook of Zoology (Volume IV – Arthropoda: Insecta. Part 35: Lepidoptera, Moths and Butterflies 1): 131–158. Walter de Gruyter, Berlin & New York. 
  (2010): Depressariidae [sic] (Flachleibmotten) in Mitteleuropa [in German]. Version of 28 March 2010. Retrieved 22 February 2010.
  (2009): Lepidoptera and Some Other Life Forms – Depressiinae [sic]. Version of 20 August 2009. Retrieved 22 April 2010.
 (1995): The Lepidoptera: Form, Function and Diversity. Oxford University Press, Oxford. 

 
Depressariidae
Moth subfamilies